Paul S. O'Brien (born 19 August 1948) is a former Australian rules footballer who played with Fitzroy in the Victorian Football League (VFL).

Notes

External links 

1948 births
Living people
Fitzroy Football Club players
Australian players of Australian rules football